Donald Francis Whiston (June 19, 1927 – July 11, 2020) was an American ice hockey player. He won a silver medal at the 1952 Winter Olympics. Afterwards he coached at Brown for three seasons.

Head coaching record

Awards and honors

References 

1927 births
2020 deaths
American men's ice hockey goaltenders
Brown Bears men's ice hockey players
Brown Bears men's ice hockey coaches
Ice hockey players at the 1952 Winter Olympics
Medalists at the 1952 Winter Olympics
Olympic silver medalists for the United States in ice hockey
Sportspeople from Lynn, Massachusetts
AHCA Division I men's ice hockey All-Americans